A Space for the Unbound is an adventure video game developed by Mojiken Studio and published by Toge Productions. It was released on January 19, 2023, for Nintendo Switch, PlayStation 4, PlayStation 5, Windows, Xbox One, and Xbox Series X/S. Set in the late 1990s, the game follows Atma and his girlfriend Raya, who live in rural Indonesia. They explore their newly attained magical abilities and deal with supernatural powers that threaten their existence.

The game designer's focus was capturing what it felt like to grow up in Indonesia in the 1990s and wanted to preserve his memories as an Indonesian through the game. Reception to the game from critics was positive, with reviews focusing on the game's solid sense of place and heartfelt story.

Gameplay 

The player controls Atma, an Indonesian high school student who is getting close to graduation with his girlfriend Raya. Through the powers of a red book that Atma finds, he gains the ability to "space dive" into people's minds and help fix their problems through puzzles that the player completes. These changes can affect the person's point of view and help them deal with trauma that they face. His girlfriend Raya, through the same book, gains "X-Men-esque powers" including levitation and changing the nature of reality. They face the issues that come from their new powers and investigate the supernatural forces that threaten their existence. Later Atma gets a magic wand and gains the ability to "rift dive" to another time in a location.

The player is able to interact with people, objects, and cats throughout the game. The game features a number of smaller minigames that help ground the game in its place and time, like practicing football and dodging falling objects with button inputs; fighting minigames which involve pressing a sequence of buttons in a time limit to attack and pressing the button when the moving bar hit the target, but most of the game is at a slower pace and involves exploring and talking with people through point and click gameplay. The game also features a number of cats, which the player can pet and name.

Development 
Dimas Novan Delfiano, the game director from the development studio Mojiken for A Space for the Unbound, began development on the title in 2015. A team of two to three people began work on the game while the studio also developed multiple other games simultaneously. Dimas completed an initial prototype of the story in 2015, which served as a core for what would be developed. Dimas found the first few years of development incredibly difficult, as he struggled to build a substantial game from the beginnings of the prototype. In 2019, Dimas noted that he had found the "right formula for the game" and Mojiken released a demo that "was released to positive reception" in 2020. Around 2020, everyone at the studio (numbering about 12-14 people) were able to shift focus to working on the game.

Dimas since a young age wanted to create a game set in an Indonesian high school, and was inspired by the concept of an "Anime pilgrimage," where people travel to compare real-life locations against their anime-depicted counterparts. He wanted to highlight his personal experience of growing up in 1990s Indonesia, and wanted players to feel the same passage of time that he had experienced. Dimas was inspired by multiple Japanese concepts during development, including "Mono no aware," or the "pathos of things," which Dimas described "as an appreciation for or awareness of impermanence and the passage of time." He noted that "every generation has its own memories and [A Space for the Unbound] is our memories and we want to preserve that before we completely forget about it." Dimas said that it was his goal to preserve his memories as an Indonesian growing up in the 1990s in the game. The game was heavily inspired by the works of Japanese filmmaker Makoto Shinkai.

The game heavily features anxiety and depression in the story, and Dimas and the rest of the development team consulted professionals for their input to help with telling it appropriately. The space diving mechanic was created to help explore these themes in more detail.

Reception 

A Space for the Unbound received positive reviews, with an 85/100 from review aggregate website Metacritic. Rock Paper Shotgun's Rachel Watts said that the game "takes a supernatural teen drama [and] gives it real heart," and called its release "a wonderful start to 2023." RPGFan's Audra Bowling felt that the game succeeded in blending both despair and anxiety with themes of hope and healing, and that it could help players see their lives from a new perspective. Nintendo Life's Lowell Bell felt that the game's length was padded out by unnecessary challenges, but still recommend it in a positive review for its touching story. Eurogamers Chris Tapsell called the game "magic" and said that "in many cases you will be deeply, maybe profoundly, moved." TouchArcade's Shaun Musgrave praised the game's support for the Nintendo Switch's touchscreen during dialogue sequences, and said it was "one of the best narrative driven indie games I've played." Nintendo World Report's Joe DeVader felt it was a "must play" for people who enjoyed narrative experiences in video games.

References

External links 
 Official Steam page

2023 video games
Adventure games
Art games
Dystopian video games
Exploration video games
Indie video games
Mystery adventure games
Nintendo Switch games
PlayStation 4 games
PlayStation 5 games
Retro-style video games
Single-player video games
Toge Productions games
Video games about mental health
Video games about suicide
Video games developed in Indonesia
Video games set in Indonesia
Video games set in the 1990s
Windows games
Xbox One games
Xbox Series X and Series S games